Genting may refer to:

 Genting, Sarawak, an inhabited place near Kelupu and Labas
Genting Group, a Malaysian conglomerate
Genting Highlands, a mountain resort in Malaysia
 Genting Grand Hotel
Genting Sempah, the mountain on which Resorts World Genting (formerly Genting Highlands Resort) is situated
Genting Sempah–Genting Highlands Highway, a federal highway in Malaysia
Genting Skyway, a gondola lift in Malaysia
Genting Snow Park, Hebei, China, the venue for the freestyle skiing and snowboarding events at the 2022 Winter Olympics